The Desire to Live is a 1973 Argentine romantic musical film directed by Julio Saraceni and starring Sandro and Elena Sedova.

Plot
Sandro plays Rolo Medina, a young athlete, who despite a life of luxury, pleasure and beautiful women, feels his life has no meaning. That feeling will change abruptly when he randomly meets Laura (Elena Sedova), who is the partner of a renowned physician, Dr. Mariano Fuentes (Juan José Miguez). The attraction between Rolo and Laura is immediate, and for the wealthy young athlete. seems to have given the desire to live. However, an unexpected event changes his life forever.

Cast
Sandro as Rolo
Elena Sedova as Laura
Juan José Míguez as  Dr. Mariano Fuentes
Miguel Bermúdez
Ricardo Passano
Adriana Aguirre
Norma Sebré
María Amelia Rodríguez
Julio García Alemán
Jorge Marchesini

Music 
Songs include:
 Pequeña mujer
 Carolina en mi piel
 Te espero bajo el sol
 El deseo de vivir
 No me dejes... No mi amor
 Diablo angelical
 Me juego entero por tu amor

References

External links
 

1973 films
1970s Spanish-language films
Argentine romantic musical films
1970s romantic musical films
Films directed by Julio Saraceni
1970s Argentine films